I Spit on Your Grave is an American rape and revenge film series that comprises two films written and directed by Meir Zarchi and three remake films, each installment following a woman who exacts revenge on each of her tormentors after four men gang rape and leave her for dead. The original 1978 film has gained a large cult following. Jennifer Hills (portrayed by Camille Keaton and Sarah Butler) is the only character to appear in every film, with the exception of the 2013 film I Spit on Your Grave 2.

Films

Original series

I Spit on Your Grave (1978)

After a young writer (Camille Keaton) is brutally raped and left for dead by four men, she systematically hunts them down one by one to exact a terrible vengeance.

I Spit on Your Grave: Deja Vu (2019)

Forty years after a woman (Camille Keaton) gets revenge on her attackers, she faces the wrath of the families of the men she killed. She and her daughter (Jamie Bernadette) are kidnapped and have to face off against a gang of degenerates overseen by a violently unhinged matriarch.

Remake series

I Spit on Your Grave (2010)

Jennifer (Sarah Butler), a writer, rents an isolated cabin in the country so she can work on her latest novel. The peace and quiet is soon shattered by a gang of local thugs who rape and torture her, then leave her for dead. But she returns for vengeance, trapping the men one by one. Jennifer inflicts pain on her attackers with a ferocity that surpasses her own ordeal.

I Spit on Your Grave 2 (2013)

A young woman (Jemma Dallender) embarks on a merciless path of revenge after three men rape and torture her.

I Spit on Your Grave III: Vengeance Is Mine (2015)

After joining a therapy group for rape victims, a woman (Sarah Butler) seeks grisly revenge against the perpetrators of the crimes.

Derivative works
The first film was followed by a slew of imitators and unofficial followups, including the unofficial remakes Turkish I Spit on Your Grave from 1979 and 1985's Naked Vengeance. Naked Vengeance film inspired the name of the unofficial sequel to the original film named Savage Vengeance (also called I Will Dance On Your Grave: Savage Vengeance) which starred Keaton once again as a woman named Jennifer. Other derivatives include the spoof I Spit Chew On Your Grave (2008) and the German I Piss on Your Cadaver (1999).

Principal cast and characters

Additional crew and production details

Reception

Box office and financial performance

Critical and public response

Home media

See also
 Rape and revenge films
 List of film series with five entries

References

 
American film series
Film series introduced in 1978
American rape and revenge films
Horror film series